Czech conjugation is the system of conjugation (grammatically-determined modifications) of verbs in Czech.

Czech is a null-subject language, i.e. the subject (including personal pronouns) can be omitted if known from context. The person is expressed by the verb:
já dělám = dělám = I do
on dělal = dělal = he was doing

Infinitive

The infinitive is formed by the ending -t, formerly also -ti; on some words -ct (-ci):
být – to be, jít – to go, péct – to bake

Somewhat archaically:
býti – to be, jíti – to go, péci – to bake

Participles

Participles are used for forming the past tense, conditionals and the passive voice in Czech. They are related to the short forms of adjectives. Therefore unlike other verb forms, they also express gender which must correspond with the gender of the subject.

Past participle

The past participle (also known as the "active participle" or "l-participle") is used for forming the past tense and the conditionals.

Passive participle

The passive participle is also called "n/t-participle" and is used for forming the passive voice. There are two types of endings:

Agreement between subject and predicate 

The predicate must always be in accordance with the subject in the sentence – in number and person (personal pronouns), and with past and passive participles also in gender. This grammatical principle affects the orthography (see also Czech orthography) – it is especially important for the correct choice and writing of plural endings of participles.

Examples:

The example mentioned shows both past (byl, byla ...) and passive (koupen, koupena ...) participles. The accordance in gender takes effect in the past tense and the passive voice, not in the present and future tenses in active voice.

If the complex subject is a combination of nouns of different genders, masculine animate gender is prior to others and the masculine inanimate and feminine genders are prior to the neuter gender. The neuter endings on the predicate are only used if all nouns in the subject are neuter and plural, otherwise the masculine inanimate/feminine forms are used.

Examples:
muži a ženy byli – men and women were
kočky a koťata byly – cats and kittens were
kotě a štěně byly – a puppy and a kitten were
koťata a štěňata byla – puppies and kittens were
my jsme byli (my = we all/men) vs. my jsme byly (my = we women) – we were

Priority of genders:
masculine animate > masculine inanimate & feminine > neuter

Transgressives
The transgressive (přechodník) expresses an action which happens coincidentally with or foregoing some other action.

The transgressive (přechodník) is an archaic form of the verb in Czech and Slovak. Nowadays, it is used only occasionally for artistic purposes or in unchanging expressions. Transgressives were still used quite widely in Czech literature in the beginning of the 20th century (not in the spoken language). For example, Jaroslav Hašek's The Good Soldier Švejk contains a lot of them.

Czech recognizes present and past transgressives. The present transgressive can express present or future action according to the aspect of the verb it is derived from. The past transgressive is usually derived from perfective verbs.

Examples:
 Usednuvši u okna, začala plakat. (Having sat down at a window, she began to cry.) – past transgressive (foregoing action)
 Děti, vidouce babičku, vyběhly ven. (The children, seeing grandma, ran out.) – present transgressive (coincident action/process)

Aspect

Czech verbs are distinguished by aspect, they are either perfective or imperfective. Perfective verbs indicate the finality of the process. Therefore, they cannot express the present tense.

Perfective verbs are usually formed adding prefixes to imperfective verbs:
psát (imperf.) – to write, to be writing → napsat (perf.) – to write down

Some perfective verbs are not formally related to imperfective ones:
brát (imperf.) – to take, to be taking → vzít (perf.) – to take

Tenses

Czech verbs express three absolute tenses – past, present and future. Relativity can be expressed by the aspect, sentence constructions and participles.

The present tense can be expressed in imperfective verbs only.

Present tense

The present tense is formed by special endings:

Verbs are divided into 5 classes according to the way of forming the present tense. They are described in more detail below.

Past tense

The past tense is formed by the past participle (in a proper gender form) and present forms of the verb být (to be) which are omitted in the 3rd person. The following example is for the male gender (animate in plural):

Dělat – to do

For the choice of past tense form when the number or gender of the subject may not be clear, see .

Future tense

In imperfective verbs, it is formed by the future forms of the verb být (to be) and the infinitive:

Dělat – to do

Budu, budeš, ... with infinitive has the same meaning as "(I, you, ...) will" in English. If not followed by an infinitive, it means "(I, you, ...) will be" (i.e. I will be = budu, not budu být).

In some verbs of motion, the future tense is formed by adding the prefix po-/pů- to the present form:
půjdu – I will go, ponesu – I will carry, povezu – I will transport (in a vehicle)

In perfective verbs, the present form expresses the future. Compare:
budu dělat – I will be doing
udělám – I will do, I will have done

Tenses in subordinate clauses 
There is no sequence of tenses in Czech. The types of clauses like in the indirect speech use tenses that express the time which is spoken about. The tense of the subordinate clause is not shifted to the past even though there is the past tense in the main clause:
Říká, že nemá dost peněz. (present tense) – He says he doesn't have enough money.
Říkal, že nemá dost peněz. (present tense) – He said he didn't have enough money.
Říkal, že Petr přišel v pět hodin. (past tense) – He said Peter had come at five o'clock.
Říkal, že to udělá v pátek. (future tense) – He said he would do it on Friday.

Imperative

The imperative mood is formed for the 2nd person singular and plural and the 1st person plural.

In the 2nd person singular, it takes either null ending or -i/-ej ending, according to the verb class.

The 2nd person plural takes the ending -te/-ete/-ejte and the 1st person plural takes -me/-eme/-ejme.

Examples:
buď! buďte! (be!) buďme! (let's be!)
spi! spěte! (sleep!) spěme! (let's sleep!)
dělej! dělejte! (do!) dělejme! (let's do!)

Conditionals

The conditionals are formed by the past participle and special forms of the verb být (to be). Following example of the present conditional is for the male gender (animate in plural):

dělal bych – I would do

There is also the past conditional in Czech but it is usually replaced by the present conditional.

byl bych dělal – I would have done

By also becomes a part of conjugations aby (so that) and kdyby (if). Therefore, these conjunctions take the same endings:
Kdybych nepracoval, nedostal bych výplatu. If I didn't work, I would get no wages.

Passive voice

There are two ways to form the passive voice in Czech:

1. By the verb být (to be) and the passive participle:
Město bylo založeno ve 14. století. The town was founded in the 14th century.

2. By adding the reflexive pronoun se:
Ono se to neudělalo. It has not been done.
To se vyrábí v Číně. It is produced in China.

However, the use of se is not exclusive to the passive voice.

Reflexive verbs

Reflexive pronouns se and si are components of reflexive verbs (se/si is not usually translated into English):
posadit se – to sit down
myslet si – to think, to suppose

Negation

Negation is formed by the prefix ne-. In the future tense and the passive voice it is added to the auxiliary verb být (to be).
nedělat – not to do
nedělám – I do not do
nedělej! do not do!
nedělal jsem – I did not do
nebudu dělat – I will not do
nedělal bych – I would not do
byl bych neudělal or nebyl bych udělal – I would not have done
není děláno – it is not done

Unlike English, a negative pronoun must be used with a negative verb (using a positive verb is ungrammatical) (double negative):
Nic nemám. – I have nothing. (literally I do not have nothing.)
Nikdy to nikomu neříkej. – Never say it to anybody. (literally Do not never say it to nobody.)

Verb classes

Class I

In imperative, 0/-te/-me endings are in most verbs, -i/-ete/-eme or -i/-ěte/-ěme if two consonants are at the end of the word-stem.

Class II

Class III

Class IV

In imperative, 0/-te/-me endings are in most verbs, -i/-ete/-eme or -i/-ěte/-ěme if two consonants are at the end of the word-stem.

Class V

Irregular verbs

Irregular future tense:
jít – půjdu, půjdeš, půjde; půjdeme, půjdete, půjdou
být – budu, budeš, bude; budeme, budete, budou

Irregular negation:
být – 3rd person sg: není (not neje)

See also
Czech declension
Czech orthography
Czech language

References

External links

Czech grammar
Indo-European verbs